Monkey's Audio is an algorithm and file format for lossless audio data compression. Lossless data compression does not discard data during the process of encoding, unlike lossy compression methods such as Advanced Audio Coding, MP3, Vorbis, and Opus. Therefore, it may be decompressed to a file that is identical to the source material.

Similar to other lossless audio codecs, files encoded to Monkey's Audio are typically reduced to about half of the original size, with data transfer time and storage requirements being reduced accordingly.

Comparisons

Like any lossless compression scheme, Monkey's Audio format takes up several times as much space as lossy compression formats. Typically, about twice as much as a 320 kbit/s bitrate MP3 file. The upside is that no data is lost compared to the input file, making lossless codecs suitable for transcoding, or simply taking up approximately half as much space as raw PCM data.

Relative to FLAC, Apple Lossless Audio Codec, or WavPack, Monkey's Audio is slow to encode or decode files.

Although Monkey's Audio is distributed as freeware, it is not open source. Among other things, the source code license terms make it impossible to legally redistribute, and invites people to infringe on the GPL license of other software. This is not compatible with The Open Source Definition or The Free Software Definition as stated by the Open Source Initiative and Free Software Foundation, respectively.

Alternatively, FLAC and WavPack are available under open source licences, and are well supported in Linux distributions and in many applications. Since all of these formats are lossless, users can transcode between formats without generation loss.

While Monkey's Audio can achieve high compression ratios, the cost is a dramatic increase in requirements on the decoding end. Many older portable media players, and even older smartphones, have difficulty handling this. In comparison, most lossless codecs are asymmetric, meaning that the work done to achieve higher compression ratios, if selected by the user, slows down the encoding process, but has essentially no effect on the decoding requirements.

Supported platforms
Officially, Monkey's Audio is available only for the Microsoft Windows platform. As of version 4.02 (19 January 2009) a DirectShow filter is distributed with the installer, allowing for compatibility with most media players running on the Windows operating system.

Monkey's Audio is also supported on Linux and OS X using JRiver Media Center or Plex.

A GPL-licensed version of the Monkey's Audio decoder has been independently written for Rockbox and is included in FFmpeg. This code also provides playback support in applications that use GStreamer, as well as DeaDBeeF.

A number of  players and rippers support the format as well.
It is also available as a port and package on FreeBSD.

Monkey's Audio files can be encoded and decoded on any platform which has a J2SE implementation, by the means of the unofficial JMAC library, which is free software licensed under the GNU LGPL.

Hardware support

Monkey's Audio is supported natively on all modern Cowon multimedia media players, the FiiO X Series and some Cayin digital audio players.

On other hardware platforms, the open source firmware project Rockbox supports playback of Monkey's Audio files on most of its supported targets, but many lack sufficient processing power to play them on the higher compression settings.

See also
Comparison of audio formats
FLAC
WavPack
Apple Lossless
MPEG-4 ALS
Meridian Lossless Packing
TTA
APE tag

References

External links
Monkey's Audio Official Website
APE Player Play Monkey's Audio files

Lossless audio codecs
Software that uses GStreamer